Godtfred Andreasen (born 10 May 1946) is a former international speedway rider from Denmark.

Speedway career 
Andreasen was a champion of Denmark, winning the Danish Championship in 1966. He rode in the top tier of British Speedway in 1968, riding for Oxford Cheetahs. He was capped by Denmark on two occasions.

References 

Living people
1946 births
Danish speedway riders
Oxford Cheetahs riders
People from Horsens
Sportspeople from the Central Denmark Region